WJGV-CD, virtual channel 48 (UHF digital channel 25), is a low-powered, Class A religious independent television station licensed to Palatka, Florida, United States. The station is owned by the Pentecostal Revival Association. WJGV-CD's studios are located on SR 19 in Palatka, and its transmitter is located southwest of the city.

History
A construction permit was granted for W49AW on February 23, 1989. The station signed on the air on March 19, 1992. It changed its callsign to WJGV-LP in 1995, then flash-cut to digital as WJGV-CD on channel 48 in 2009. The station moved to channel 25 in 2011.

Digital channels
The station's digital signal is multiplexed:

References

External links
 

JGV-CD
Low-power television stations in the United States
Religious television stations in the United States
Television channels and stations established in 1992
1992 establishments in Florida
Palatka, Florida